Monique Noirot (born Wideman  on  10 October 1941 at Talence) is a former French athlete who specialised in the 400 meters.

Biography 
Monique distinguished herself in the 1966 European Championships at Budapest winning the bronze medal in the 400 meters with a time of 54.0s. Selected for 1968 Summer Olympics, Monique Noirot was eliminated in the semi-final round of the 400 meters won two days later by her compatriot Colette Besson.

Running for team  ASPTT Bordeaux, Monique Noirot won four national titles (200m in 1964, 400 m from 1965 to 1967) and improved five times the record of France's 400 meters. Her personal best was 53.1s, established during the 1967 season.

She is the mother of Olivier Noirot, multiple champion of France and former national record holder in the 400 meters.

prize list

References

External links 
 Olympic profile for Monique Noirot at sports-reference.com

Living people
1941 births
People from Talence
French female sprinters
Olympic athletes of France
Athletes (track and field) at the 1968 Summer Olympics
European Athletics Championships medalists
Sportspeople from Gironde
Olympic female sprinters